Ghislaine Crozaz (born 1939) is a cosmochemist known for her research on the early history of the solar system through tracking trace elements in meteorites.

Education and career
Crozaz received a B.Sc. in 1961 and a Ph.D. in 1967 from the University of Brussels. In 1967, and from 1971 to 1972, she was a visiting associate in Geochemistry at California Institute of Technology. She moved to  Washington University in St. Louis as a postdoctoral investigator in the lab of Robert M. Walker (physicist). As of 2021, she is professor emerita in Earth and Planetary Sciences at Washington University in St. Louis and lives in Brussels.

The planet Ghislaine, discovered in 1986 by Carolyn Shoemaker and Eugene Shoemaker, is named after Crozaz.

Research
While a Ph.D. student, Crozaz pioneered the use of lead-210 to establish ages in ice cores in Antarctica and Greenland. While working in Brussels, Crozaz became interested in space science and meteorites she started working on the first lunar samples returned to Earth  during the Apollo 11 mission. She started her research in this arena by looking at fission tracks in lunar samples. These lunar samples are still serving as the basis for scientific research many years later. Crozaz went on to work with Ernest Zinner to develop an ion microprobe method to measure rare earth elements in the individual crystals found in extraterrestrial and terrestrial rocks. Crozaz later participated in group efforts to sample meteorites in Antarctica, one of which was the first lunar sample found on Earth, and through this research examined the history of meteorites found in Antarctica.

Selected publications

Personal life
Crozaz was married to Robert Walker, with whom she shared an interest in lunar materials.

Awards and honors
 Fellow, American Geophysical Union (2002)
 Fellow, Meteoritical Society (1984)

References

Fellows of the American Geophysical Union
Université libre de Bruxelles alumni
Washington University in St. Louis faculty
Women geologists
Space scientists
Living people
Scientists from Missouri
1939 births